Parauaea was an ancient Greek territory in the region of Epirus. The inhabitants of the area were known as Parauaioi (also known as Parauaei or Parauaeans), a Thesprotian Greek tribe whose name meant "those dwelling beside" the Aous river.

History
Due to the fact that Greek toponyms that preserve archaic features are very densely found in the wider area (Epirus, western and northern Thessaly and Pieria), it appears that speakers of the Proto-Greek language inhabited a region which included Parauaea before the Late Bronze Age migrations (late 3rd-early 2nd millennium BC).

At the beginning of the Peloponnesian War (429 BC), the Parauaei under the leadership of king Oroidos joined forced together with the nearby Orestae as allies of Sparta against Acarnania. That time they were more loosely associated with the adjacent tribes of the Molossians and the Atintanes.

In 350 BC, Parauaea was incorporated into the Greek kingdom of Macedon as part of Upper Macedonia. Later in 294 BC, the area was under the control of Pyrrhus of Epirus. In the 3rd century BC, they are described as a "Thesprotian nation/tribe" by Rhianus and by Stephanus of Byzantium (6th century AD) quoting Rhianus.

Location
Parauaea was among the northern Epirote tribal regions in antiquity.

See also
Orestis (region)
Tymphaea

References

Citations

Sources

 

Ancient tribes in Epirus
Geography of ancient Epirus
Greek tribes
Upper Macedonia